Debra Dunning (born July 11, 1966) is an American actress, model, television host, spokesperson and comedienne. She is best known for playing Heidi on Home Improvement (1993–1999).

Career 
Dunning played Heidi Keppert, the "Tool Time girl", on the ABC sitcom Home Improvement from season 3 to season 8, having guest-starred in an earlier season.

She appeared in Dangerous Curves (1988) and the American Gladiators Celebrity Challenge (1989).

Personal life 
From 1997 until 2018, Dunning was married to American volleyball player Steve Timmons, with whom she has three children: daughter Spencer Schae (born 1996) and sons Stoney (born 2000) and Sysco (born 2008).

Filmography

References

External links 

 

1966 births
Living people
American television actresses
Female models from California
Actresses from Burbank, California
People from Cambridge, Ohio
20th-century American actresses
21st-century American actresses
American Gladiators contestants